A junzi ( or "Son of the Vassal, or Monarch") is a Chinese philosophical term often translated as "gentleman," "superior person", or "noble man." The term is frequently translated as "gentleman", since the characters are overtly gendered. However, in recent years, scholars have been using the term without the gender component, and translate the term as "distinguished person", "moral person", and so on. The characters 君子 were employed by both the Duke Wen of Zhou in the "Classic of Changes" 易經 (I-ching) and Confucius in his works to describe the ideal man.

Confucianism 
In Confucianism, the ideal personality is the 聖 shèng , translated as saint or sage. However, sagehood is hard to attain and so Confucius used the noun junzi, respectable person, which more individuals could achieve. Junzi acts according to proper conduct (禮 lǐ  or li) to achieve 和 hé or he, harmony, which Confucianism maintains should rule the home, society, and the empire. Li primarily has to do with social expectations, both in terms of the formal behavior required during religious rites and imperial ceremonies and proper conduct in human relationships. Confucius also considered a junzi to be someone who embodies humanity – one who possesses a totality of the highest human qualities. The philosopher called this a person who embodies the concept of 仁  rén and outlined specific qualities, which were recorded by his disciples in the Analects. Many of these were used as Chinese proverbs (諺語 yàn yǔ ). An example is 君子成人之美 jūn zǐ chéng rén zhī měi, which figuratively means "A respectable person [always helps] others in their needs".

Zhu Xi defined a junzi as second only to the sage.

Junzi has many characteristics. A junzi can live with poverty; a junzi does more and speaks less. A junzi is loyal, obedient and knowledgeable. A junzi disciplines himself. Among these, 仁 ren is at the core of a junzi.

Leadership 
As the potential leader of a nation and country, the son of the ruler is raised to express superior ethical and moral positions while gaining inner peace through virtue. To Confucius, the junzi sustained the functions of government and social stratification through his ethical values. Despite its literal meaning, any righteous man willing to improve himself can become a junzi.

By contrast the xiaoren (xiăorén, "scoundrel, small or petty person") does not grasp the value of virtues and seeks only immediate personal gain. The scoundrel, or petty person, is egotistic and does not consider the consequences of his/her actions. Should the ruler be surrounded by xiaoren as opposed to junzi,  governance and the people will suffer due to their selfish small-mindness. Examples of such xiaoren individuals can range from those who indulge in self-satisfying sensual and emotional pleasures and gains to the career politician who is interested merely in power and fame; neither aiming for the long-term benefit of others. There are many expressions in Confucius' writings that contrast the two; for instance 君子和而不同，小人同而不和。jūn zǐ hé ér bù tóng , xiǎo rén tóng ér bù hé "The noble person acts in harmony with others but does not seek to be like them; the petty person seeks to be like others and does not act in harmony."

The junzi rules by acting virtuously himself. It is thought that his pure virtue would lead others to follow his example. The ultimate goal is that government behaves much like family. Thus at all levels filial piety promotes harmony and the junzi acts as a beacon for this piety.

See also

Confucianism
Bodhisattva
Four Gentlemen
Four Sages

New Man (utopian concept)
Übermensch
Zhenren

References

See also 
Lunyu 論語, The Analects; the Database of Religious History, at https://religiondatabase.org/browse/1063/#/

Concepts in Chinese philosophy
Confucian ethics
Chinese words and phrases
Chinese culture